The 1999 USL D3 Pro League was the 13th season of third-division soccer in the United States, and was the third season of now-defunct USL D3 Pro League, and its first since the name change to United Soccer League.

League standings

Playoffs
First Round:
 Northern Virginia defeated South Carolina, 2-1 (SO)
Conference Semifinals:
 Western Mass defeated Reading, 4-0
 New Hampshire defeated New Jersey, 3-2
 Charlotte defeated Northern Virginia, 4-0.
 Wilmington defeated Carolina, 1-0 (OT)
 Texas defeated Austin, 8-4.
 Chico defeated Arizona, 1-0 (SO)
Conference Finals:
 Western Mass. defeated New Hampshire, 1-0 (OT)
 Charlotte defeated Wilmington, 3-2.
 Chico defeated Texas, 3-2 (SO)
Semifinals:
 Western Mass defeated Chico, 4-1.
 South Jersey defeated Charlotte, 3-2 (SO).
CHAMPIONSHIP:
 Western Mass. Defeated South Jersey, 2-1.

References

1999
3